Translators and scholars have translated the main works attributed to Homer,  the Iliad and Odyssey, from the Homeric Greek into English since the 16th and 17th centuries. Translations are ordered chronologically by date of first publication, with first lines provided to illustrate the style of the translation.

Not all translators translated both the Iliad and Odyssey; in addition to the complete translations listed here, numerous partial translations, ranging from several lines to complete books, have appeared in a variety of publications.

The "original" text cited below is that of "the Oxford Homer."

Iliad

Reference text

16th and 17th centuries (1581–1700)

Early 18th century (1701–1750)

Late 18th century (1751–1800)

Early 19th century (1801–1850)

Late middle 19th century (1851–1875)

Late 19th century (1876–1900)

Early 20th century (1901–1925)

Early middle 20th century (1926–1950)

Late middle 20th century (1951–1975)

Late 20th century (1976–2000)

21st century

Odyssey

Reference text

17th century (1615–1700)

Early 18th century (1701–1750)

Late 18th century (1751–1800)

Early 19th century (1801–1850)

Late middle 19th century (1851–1875)

Late 19th century (1876–1900)

Early 20th century (1901–1925)

Early middle 20th century (1926–1950)

Late middle 20th century (1951–1975)

Late 20th century (1976–2000)

21st century

Notes

References

Further reading 
 
 Nikoletseas, Michael M. The Iliad - Twenty Centuries of Translation: a Critical View, 2012

External links 
 
 Published English Translations of Homer's Iliad and Odyssey  by Ian Johnston. Retrieved 16 August 2010.
 

Homer, English translations
Homer, English translations
Iliad
Odyssey
Homer, English translations
Translation-related lists